Emmanuel Ngama (born July 1, 1992, in Bujumbura) is a Burundian football player currently playing for Atlanta Lions.

Career 
He joined on 1 July 2008 from Atlético Olympic Bujumbura (Burundi) to  FCV Dender EH. He played only 3 games for FCV Dender EH and joined in summer 2009 to Atlanta Lions.

International career 
Ngama played his first international game on 6 September 2009 against Seychelles national football team.

References 

1988 births
Living people
Burundian footballers
Burundi international footballers
Expatriate footballers in Belgium
F.C.V. Dender E.H. players
Burundian expatriates in Belgium
Association football midfielders
21st-century Burundian people